Edmund Webster may refer to:
 Edmund A. Webster, Secretary of State of Alabama
 Edmund Foster Webster, British civil servant of the Indian Civil Service